Morton Freedgood (1913 – April 16, 2006) was an American author who wrote The Taking of Pelham One Two Three and many other detective and mystery novels under the pen name  John Godey.

Biography
Freedgood was born in Brooklyn, New York City, New York in 1913 and began writing at a young age. In the 1940s, he had several articles and short stories published in Cosmopolitan, Collier's, Esquire and other magazines while working full-time in the motion picture industry in New York City. He held public relations and publicity posts for United Artists, 20th Century Fox, Paramount and other companies for several years before focusing on his writing. Freedgood also served as an infantryman in the U.S. Army during World War II.

His novel The Wall-to-Wall Trap was published under his own name in 1957. He then began using the pen name John Godey—borrowed from the name of a 19th-century women's magazine—to differentiate his crime novels from his more serious writing.

As Godey, he achieved commercial success with the books A Thrill a Minute With Jack Albany, Never Put Off Till Tomorrow What You Can Kill Today and The Three Worlds of Johnny Handsome. He saw his Jack Albany stories turned into the 1968 Walt Disney film Never a Dull Moment, starring Dick Van Dyke. The Taking of Pelham One Two Three, his novel about the hijacking of a New York City Subway train, was a best seller in 1973 and was made into the 1974 movie starring Walter Matthau and Robert Shaw, a 1998 TV-movie remake of the same title, and a 2009 theatrical-feature remake, The Taking of Pelham 1 2 3.

His work was later referenced in the film Reservoir Dogs and Beastie Boys song "Sure Shot".

He died April 16, 2006 in his home in West New York, NJ.

Bibliography

Published under his pen name John Godey unless otherwise noted.

Notes

1913 births
2006 deaths
American mystery writers
American thriller writers
People from West New York, New Jersey
American male novelists
20th-century American novelists
20th-century American male writers